Matilda of Holstein or Mechthild (1220 or 1225 – 1288 in Kiel) was a Danish queen consort, married to King Abel of Denmark and later to Birger Jarl, Regent of Sweden.

Life 
Matilda was the daughter of Adolf IV, Count of Holstein, and Heilwig of Lippe. On 25 April 1237 she was married to Abel of Denmark in Schleswig. The marriage was arranged to form a tie between Holstein and Sønderjylland. In 1239, Abel became the guardian of her minor brothers.

When Abel became king in 1250, she was crowned with him in Roskilde on 1 November. When Abel died in 1252, he was succeeded by his brother rather than her son Valdemar, who was imprisoned at Cologne at the time, and she was forced to leave Denmark and enter a convent.

She managed to get her son Valdemar released from the captivity of the Archbishop of Cologne and fought for the inheritance of her children in the Duchy of Schleswig. In 1253, she secured the Duchy of Sønderjylland for her son Valdemar. 
 
In 1260, her son Valdemar died, and she secured the Duchy for her next son, Erik. The same year, however, she pawned the areas Eider and Schlei in southern Denmark to her brothers.
 
She made a pact with Jacob Erlandsen, archbishop of Lund, and then broke her vows from the convent by marrying the Swedish regent Birger Jarl in 1261. Birger had been one of her late husband Abel's major antagonists who had started up a military vendetta against him which was only stopped by Abel's death. After Birger's death in 1266, Matilda moved to Kiel, yet her own grave is with Birger's in Varnhem, Sweden.

In 1288, shortly before her death, she gave up Eider and Schlei to her brothers. She was unpopular in Denmark, where she was called the "daughter of the Devil" and accused of destroying letters from the Pope and emperor to King Valdemar II.

Issue 

Queen Matilda bore her first husband three sons and a daughter:

Valdemar III (1238–1257); Duke of Schleswig 1254–1257
Sophie (born 1240, date of death unknown)
Eric I (c. 1241 – 27 May 1272); Duke of Schleswig 1260–1272
Abel (1252–1279)

References

 Dansk Biografisk Lexikon, volume 11, pp. 205–206, Copenhagen 1897
Annales Stadenses 1237–1241, MGH SS XVI, sida 363–367

1220s births
1288 deaths
Danish royal consorts
House of Schauenburg
House of Bjelbo
House of Estridsen
Burials at Varnhem Abbey
13th-century German nobility
13th-century Danish nobility
13th-century Swedish nobility
13th-century German women
13th-century Swedish women
13th-century Danish women
Remarried royal consorts
Daughters of monarchs